Pierre Richard (born Pierre-Richard Maurice Charles Léopold Defays; 16 August 1934) is a French actor, film director and screenwriter, best known for the roles of a clumsy daydreamer in comedy films. Pierre Richard is considered by many, such as Louis de Funès and Gérard Depardieu, to be one of the greatest and most talented French comedians in the last 50 years. He is also a film director and occasional singer.

Early life 
Pierre Richard was born in a bourgeois family from Valenciennes. He is the grandson of Léopold Defays who was the director of the company Escaut-et-Meuse. His name comes from the stage name of Pierre Richard-Willm who was his mother's favorite actor. Pierre Richard spent his childhood and a part of his teenage years in his native city where he was a student at the Henri-Wallon high school.

Skipping classes regularly to go to the cinema, it was Danny Kaye in Up in Arms that revealed his vocation. This was received with only a moderate enthusiasm by his family, but he decided nonetheless to go to Paris to study dramatic arts at the famous Ecole Charles Dullin. His debuts were far from brilliant (he wanted to play straight drama, which was not in his nature) and he studied kinesiotherapy to have a safety exit if needed, but he didn't renounce acting.

Acting career 

After a short stint as an extra at Jean Vilar's Théâtre National Populaire, Pierre Richard started his career with Antoine Bourseiller and, to augment his income, created a comedy duet with Victor Lanoux. They performed with great success in famous Parisian cabarets and music-halls sketches they had written themselves. He then began his film career in 1968 in the film Alexandre le Bienheureux (Very Happy Alexander) directed by Yves Robert. In 1970, he directed his first film Le Distrait, followed by Les Malheurs d'Alfred (1972) and Je ne sais rien mais je dirai tout (I Don't Know Much, But I'll Say Everything) (1973). He worked again with Yves Robert for the film Le Grand Blond avec une chaussure noire (The Tall Blond Man with One Black Shoe) (1973) and its sequel The Return of the Tall Blond Man with One Black Shoe (1974), both written by Francis Veber, who then cast him in the main role in his directorial film debut, Le Jouet (The Toy) (1976). Their partnership achieved further success in three successful comedies of the early 1980s, La Chèvre (1981), Les Compères (1983) and Les Fugitifs (1986), which paired Richard with Gérard Depardieu. Richard returned behind the camera to direct On peut toujours rêver (1991) and Droit dans le mur (1997).

Recurring names 
Among his most famous film roles, Pierre Richard came to play different characters with the same name but without any link between them. He is named :
François Perrin in the films :
The Tall Blond Man with One Black Shoe and The Return of the Tall Blond Man with One Black Shoe, a violinist used as a "booby trap" and taken as a secret agent,
On aura tout vu, a photographer who writes a script and sells it to a producer of pornographic films (Jean-Pierre Marielle),
The Toy, an unemployed journalist bought as a toy in a big store by the son of a powerful and wealthy businessman (Michel Bouquet),
La Chèvre, an incredibly unlucky accountant sent to Mexico and assistant of a private detective (Gérard Depardieu) ;
Pierre Renaud in the films :
Je suis timide mais je me soigne, a hotel cashier suffering of a sickly shyness and attempting to seduce a rich customer with the help of a marital agent (Aldo Maccione),
C'est pas moi, c'est lui, a ghostwriter writing for the same author and getting his chance working for a famous producer (Aldo Maccione) ;
François Pignon in the films :
Les Compères, a depressive unemployed teacher, in charge of an investigation with a macho journalist (Gérard Depardieu),
Les Fugitifs, a father of a five-year-old girl, unemployed for three years, attempts a bank robbery and forces a former burglar (Gérard Depardieu) to accompany him as he leaves the scene.

Other activities 
Since 1986, Pierre Richard has also become a businessman and winemaker. He owns the restaurant Au pied de chameau in Paris and a 50-hectare vineyard which produces some 80,000 bottles a year (red and rosé) labelled as Château Bel Évêque in Gruissan in the department of Aude.

Personal life 
Married and divorced three times, he has two sons who are both actors and musicians, Olivier is a group member of "Blues trottoir" and plays the saxophone whereas Christophe plays the double bass. His grandson, Arthur Defays, is a model and actor.

Filmography
Pierre Richard has played in all the films he has directed.

Publications 
 
 
 
 Pierre Richard and Jérémie Imbert, Je sais rien mais je dirai tout (autobiography). Preface by Gérard Depardieu. Éditions Flammarion, 2015.

Distinctions 
 Karlovy Vary International Film Festival 1996 : Best Actor for A Chef in Love
 Just for Laughs Festival of Montréal 2004 : Honorary Prize
 31st César Awards 2006 : Honorary Cesar 
 Magritte Awards 2015 (Belgium) : Honorary Prize
 Chevalier (Knight) of the Legion of Honour

Documentaries 
 Un jour, un destin : Pierre Richard, l'incompris (A film by Laurent Allen-Caron). Broadcast on France 2 on 6 September 2015 and again on 31 December 2015.
 Pierre Richard, the quiet one directed by Gregory Monro in 2018

References

External links

Official website
Official web television
Site of wines by Pierre Richard

1934 births
César Honorary Award recipients
French male film actors
French male television actors
French comedians
French viticulturists
Living people
Magritte Award winners
People from Valenciennes
Young Leaders of the French-American Foundation